William Alan Bateman (19 June 1936 – 18 August 2012) was an Australian film producer and television screenwriter, producer and director best known as the creator and original executive producer of the soap opera Home and Away, the series he created. He was the head of drama and director manager of the Seven Network and General Manager of Network Ten.

Early life
He was the son of William Glyde Bateman.

Death
Bateman died on 18 August 2012 from cancer.

Filmography
 Ring of Scorpio (1991)
 Family and Friends (1990)
 The Flying Doctors (1989–1990)
 The Rainbow Warrior Conspiracy (1989)
 The Power, the Passion (1989)
 Great Performances (1988)
 The Rocks (1988)
 Home and Away (1988-Present)
 The Fremantle Conspiracy (1988)
 Nancy Wake (1987)
 Rolf's Walkabout (1970)

References

External links
 

1936 births
2012 deaths
Writers from Perth, Western Australia
Australian film producers
Australian soap opera writers
Australian television producers
Australian television directors
Australian male television writers